Callidiellum cupressi is a species of beetle in the family Cerambycidae. It was described by Van Dyke in 1923.

References

Callidiini
Beetles described in 1923